Thomas Bowen (9 November 1900–1954) was an English footballer who played in the Football League for Coventry City, Walsall and Wolverhampton Wanderers.

References

1900 births
1954 deaths
English footballers
Association football forwards
English Football League players
Birmingham City F.C. players
Walsall F.C. players
Wolverhampton Wanderers F.C. players
Coventry City F.C. players
Kidderminster Harriers F.C. players